The Guide (Povodyr) is a 2014 Ukrainian drama film directed by Oles Sanin. It was selected as the Ukrainian entry for the Best Foreign Language Film at the 87th Academy Awards, but was not nominated. There was some controversy over the selection of the film in Ukraine regarding the voting process. There is a special audiodescripted version for blind people.

Plot
Soviet Ukraine, 1930s. American engineer Michael Shamrock arrives in Kharkiv with his ten-year-old son, Peter to help "build socialism". He falls in love with an actress Olga who has another admirer, Commissar Vladimir.

Under tragic circumstances, the American is killed and his son is saved from his pursuers by a blind bard (kobzar). With no other chance to survive in a foreign land, the boy becomes his guide.

Cast
 Stanislav Boklan as Ivan Kocherga
 Jeff Burrell as Michael Shamrock
 Anton Sviatoslav Greene as Peter Shamrock
 Oleksandr Kobzar as Comrade Vladimir
 Iryna Sanina as Orysia
 Jamala as Olga

Awards and nominations

See also
 List of submissions to the 87th Academy Awards for Best Foreign Language Film
 List of Ukrainian submissions for the Academy Award for Best Foreign Language Film
 Persecuted bandurists
 Famine-33 (1991)

References

External links
 
 Official website of THE GUIDE
 Povodyr(The Guide) - Pressbook

2014 films
2014 drama films
2010s historical drama films
Ukrainian historical drama films
Ukrainian-language films
Films set in Ukraine
Films about the Holodomor